The Discreet Charm of the Bourgeoisie is a 1972 surrealist film directed by Luis Buñuel from a screenplay co-written with Jean-Claude Carrière. The narrative concerns a group of bourgeois people attempting—despite continual interruptions—to dine together. The French-language film stars Fernando Rey, Stéphane Audran, Jean-Pierre Cassel, Paul Frankeur, Delphine Seyrig, Bulle Ogier, Julien Bertheau, and Milena Vukotic.

The film consists of several thematically linked scenes: five gatherings of a group of bourgeois friends, and the four dreams of different characters. The beginning of the film focuses on the gatherings, while the latter part focuses on the dreams, but both types of scenes are intertwined. There are also scenes involving other characters, such as two involving a Latin American female terrorist from the fictional Republic of Miranda. The film's world is not logical: the bizarre events are accepted by the characters, even if they are impossible or contradictory.

Buñuel plays tricks on his characters, luring them toward fine dinners that they expect, and then repeatedly frustrating them in inventive ways. They bristle, and politely express their outrage, but they never stop trying; they relentlessly expect and pursue all that they desire, as though it were their natural right to have others serve and pamper them. He exposes their sense of entitlement, their hypocrisy, and their corruption. In the dream sequences, he explores their intense fears—not just of public humiliation, but of being caught by police and of being mowed down by guns. At least one character's dream sequence is later revealed to be nested, or embedded, in another character's dream sequence. As the dreams-within-dreams unfold, it appears that Buñuel is also playing tricks on his audience as they try to make sense of the story.

The film was both a critical and commercial success. It won the Academy Award for Best Foreign Language Film, and BAFTA Awards for Best Actress in a Leading Role (Audran) and Best Original Screenplay (Buñuel, Carrière).

Plot
A bourgeois couple, François and Simone Thévenot, accompany François's colleague Don Rafael Acosta, the ambassador from the South American nation of Miranda, and Simone's sister Florence, to the house of the Sénéchals, the hosts of a dinner party. Once they arrive, Alice Sénéchal is surprised to see them and explains that she expected them the following evening and has no dinner prepared. The would-be guests then invite Alice to join them for dinner at a nearby inn.

Arriving at the inn, the party finds it locked. They knock and are reluctantly invited in by a waitress who mentions that the restaurant is under new management. Inside, there are no diners, and the prices on the menu are disconcertingly low. The party hears wailing from an adjoining room and discovers a vigil for the corpse of the manager, who died a few hours earlier. The party is told that the coroner is coming soon, but they hurriedly depart.

Later, at the Embassy of Miranda, Acosta meets with François and Alice's husband Henri to discuss the proceeds of a large cocaine deal. During the meeting, Acosta sees a young woman selling clockwork-animal toys on the footpath outside the embassy. He shoots one of the toys with a rifle and the woman runs off. He explains that she is part of a Maoist Mirandan terrorist group that's been targeting him for months.

Two days later, the bourgeois friends attempt to have lunch at the Sénéchals', but Henri and his wife escape to the garden to have sex instead of joining them. One of the friends take their unexplained absence to mean that the Sénéchals know the police are coming and have left to avoid arrest for their involvement in drug trafficking. The party again leaves in a panic.

When the Sénéchals return from the garden, their friends are gone, but they meet a bishop who has donned their gardener's clothing. They throw him out, but when he returns wearing his bishop's robes, they embrace him with deference. The bishop asks to work for them as their gardener. He tells them about his childhood — that his parents were murdered by arsenic poisoning and that the culprit was never apprehended. (Later in the film, he goes to visit a dying man who turns out to be his parents' murderer; after blessing the man, the bishop kills him with a shotgun.)

The women visit a teahouse just as it has run out of all beverages – tea, coffee, and milk – although it finally transpires that they do have water. While they are waiting, a soldier tells them about his childhood: how after his mother's death his cold-hearted father sent him to military school. The ghost of the soldier's mother informed him that the man was not his real father but his father's killer; they had dueled over his mother. Following the ghost's request, the soldier killed the culprit with poison.

Simone meets Acosta at his apartment. They are having an affair but are interrupted by a visit from her husband, whereupon she makes a convenient excuse and leaves with him. Acosta is next visited by the same terrorist from earlier, who has come to kill him. He ambushes and chastises her, then tells her to leave when she refuses his sexual advances; his agents capture her and take her away.

Several abortive dinner parties ensue; interruptions include the arrival of a group of army officers and enlisted men, who join the dinner only to be called away for alarmingly close military maneuvers, the revelation that a colonel's dining-room is a stage set in a theatrical performance for an audience that is angry with the actors for not knowing their lines, the ambassador's shooting of the colonel after he insults the nation of Miranda and slaps the ambassador, the arrest and release of the bourgeois friends, and their summary execution by the terrorists. Most if not all of these scenes turn out to be dream sequences in which ghosts make frequent appearances.

A recurring scene throughout the film, of the six people walking silently and purposefully on a long, isolated country road, is also the final sequence.

Cast

 Fernando Rey as Rafael Acosta
 Paul Frankeur as François Thévenot
 Delphine Seyrig as Simone Thévenot
 Bulle Ogier as Florence Thévenot
 Stéphane Audran as Alice Sénéchal
 Jean-Pierre Cassel as Henri Sénéchal
Julien Bertheau as Monsignor Dufour, the Bishop
Milena Vukotic as Inès, the Sénéchals' maid
Claude Piéplu as the Colonel
Maria Gabriella Maione as the female terrorist
Muni as the peasant
Michel Piccoli as the Minister of the Interior
Pierre Maguelon as Brigadier Sanglant
François Maistre as Commissaire Delecluze
Jacques Rispal as the Gendarme
Christian Baltauss as Lt. Hubert de Rochcahin
Amparo Soler Leal as Rochcahin's mother
 Georges Douking as the gardener
Maxence Mailfort as the dreaming Sergeant
Alix Mahieux as the Colonel's wife
Bernard Musson as the Tea Room waiter

Production

Pre-production
After having announced that Tristana (1970) would be his last film because he felt he was repeating himself, Luis Buñuel met with screenwriter Jean-Claude Carrière and discussed the topic of repetition. Shortly afterwards, Buñuel met with film producer Serge Silberman, who told him an anecdote about having forgotten about a dinner party and being surprised to find six hungry friends show up at his front door. Buñuel was suddenly inspired, and Silberman agreed to give him a $2,000 advance to write a new script with Carrière, combining Silberman's anecdote with the idea of repetition. Buñuel and Carrière wrote the first draft in three weeks and finished the fifth draft by the Summer of 1971, originally titled Bourgeois Enchantment. Silberman was finally able to raise the money for the film in April 1972, and Buñuel began pre-production.

Buñuel cast many actors whom he had worked with in the past, such as Fernando Rey and Michel Piccoli, and catered their roles to their personalities. He had more difficulty casting the female leads and allowed actresses Delphine Seyrig and Stéphane Audran to choose which parts they would like to play, before changing the script to better suit the actresses. Jean-Pierre Cassel auditioned for his role and was surprised when Buñuel cast him after simply glancing at him once.

Filming and editing
Filming began on 15 May 1972, and lasted for two months with an $800,000 budget. In his usual shooting style, Buñuel shot few takes and often edited the film in camera and during production. Buñuel and Silberman had a long-running and humorous argument as to whether Buñuel took one day or one and a half days to edit his films.

On the advice of Silberman, Buñuel used video playback monitors on the set for the first time in his career, resulting in a vastly different style than any of his previous films, including zooms and travelling shots instead of his usual close-ups and static camera framing. It also resulted in Buñuel's being more comfortable on set, and in limiting his already minimal direction to technical and physical instructions. This frustrated Cassel, who had never worked with Buñuel before, until Rey explained that this was Buñuel's usual style and that since they were playing aristocrats their movements and physical appearance were more important than their inner motivation.

Buñuel once joked that whenever he needed an extra scene he simply filmed one of his own dreams. The Discreet Charm of the Bourgeoisie includes three of Buñuel's recurring dreams: a dream of being on stage and forgetting his lines, a dream of meeting his dead cousin in the street and following him into a house full of cobwebs, and a dream of waking up to see his dead parents staring at him.

Reception
The film was a box office hit in both Europe and the US, and critically praised. Roger Ebert called it a comedy but noted that Buñuel’s comedies were “more like a dig in the ribs, sly and painful.” Robert Benayoun said that it was "perhaps [Buñuel's] most direct and most 'public' film". Vincent Canby wrote in his 1972 review of the film, “In addition to being extraordinarily funny and perfectly acted, The Discreet Charm moves with the breathtaking speed and self-assurance that only a man of Buñuel’s experience can achieve without resorting to awkward ellipsis.” Buñuel later said that he was disappointed with the analysis that most film critics made of the film. He also disliked the film's promotional poster, depicting a pair of lips with legs and a derby hat. 

Buñuel and Silberman travelled to the US in late 1972 to promote the film. Buñuel did not attend his own press screening in Los Angeles and told a reporter at Newsweek that his favorite characters in the film were the cockroaches. While visiting LA, Buñuel, Carrière and Silberman were invited to a lunch party by Buñuel's old friend George Cukor, and other guests included Alfred Hitchcock, Billy Wilder, George Stevens, Rouben Mamoulian, John Ford, William Wyler, Robert Mulligan and Robert Wise. (resulting in a famous photograph of the directors together, other than an ailing Ford). Fritz Lang was unable to attend, but Buñuel visited him the following day and received an autographed photo from Lang, one of his favorite directors.

On Rotten Tomatoes, the film maintains a rating of 98% based on 57 reviews with the consensus: "An intoxicating dose of the director's signature surrealist style, The Discreet Charm of the Bourgeoisie represents Buñuel at his most accessible."

Awards and nominations

Oscars win
When the time came to release the film, producer Serge Silberman decided not to wait until May 1973 to premiere it at the Cannes Film Festival and instead released it in the fall of 1972 specifically to make it eligible for the Academy Award for Best Foreign Language Film. Buñuel was famously indifferent to awards and jokingly told a reporter that he had already paid $25,000 in order to win the Oscar. The Discreet Charm of the Bourgeoisie did win the Oscar for Best Foreign Language Film and Silberman accepted on Buñuel's behalf at the ceremony. At the Academy's request, Buñuel posed for a photograph while holding the Oscar, but while wearing a wig and oversized sunglasses.

Home media
In June 2022, The Discreet Charm of the Bourgeoisie received a 4K digital restoration from StudioCanal for its 50th anniversary. The restoration was issued on Blu-ray and DVD formats.

Unproduced musical
In October 2014, Stephen Sondheim stated that he and playwright David Ives were working on a new musical with a plot inspired by both The Discreet Charm of the Bourgeoisie and another of Buñuel's films, The Exterminating Angel (1962). In April 2021, Sondheim revealed that these plans had been shelved.

See also
 Bourgeois personality
 List of fictional countries
 List of French submissions for the Academy Award for Best Foreign Language Film
 List of submissions to the 45th Academy Awards for Best Foreign Language Film

References

Bibliography

Further reading

External links
 
 
 
The Discreet Charm of the Bourgeoisie at Film Reference 

1972 films
20th Century Fox films
1970s avant-garde and experimental films
1970s French films
1970s French-language films
1970s Italian films
1972 comedy-drama films
Best Foreign Language Film Academy Award winners
Bourgeoisie
Criticism of capitalism
Films about dreams
Films about drugs
Films about food and drink
Films about terrorism in Europe
Films about the upper class
Films directed by Luis Buñuel
Films produced by Serge Silberman
Films set in South America
Films whose writer won the Best Screenplay BAFTA Award
Films with screenplays by Jean-Claude Carrière
French black comedy films
French comedy-drama films
Italian black comedy films
Italian comedy-drama films
National Society of Film Critics Award for Best Film winners
Spanish black comedy films
Spanish comedy-drama films
Films without soundtracks